The 2008–09 Euroleague was the 9th season of the professional basketball competition for elite clubs throughout Europe, organised by Euroleague Basketball Company, and it was the 52nd season of the premier competition for European men's clubs overall. The season, which featured 24 teams from 13 countries, culminated in the 2008–09 Euroleague Final Four at the new O2 World arena in Berlin, Germany. It was won by Panathinaikos, who defeated in the final, the defending champions, CSKA Moscow.

While the general structure of the competition was identical to that used in recent seasons, changes were made to the format for two of its phases, the Regular Season and Quarterfinals.

Teams of the 2008–09 Euroleague

DKV Joventut qualified as ULEB Cup winners.

Team rosters

Format
Regular Season

The first phase was a regular season, in which the competing teams were drawn into four groups, each containing six teams. Each team played every other team in its group at home and away, resulting in 10 games for each team in the first stage. The top 4 teams in each group advanced to the next round. This was the first year for this particular format; previously, the competing teams were split into three groups of eight teams each, with the top five teams in each group plus the best sixth-place team advancing.

If two or more clubs finished level on won-lost record, tiebreakers were applied in the following order:
Head-to-head record in matches between the tied clubs
Overall point difference in games between the tied clubs
Overall point difference in all group matches
Points scored in all group matches
Sum of quotients of points scored and points allowed in each group match

Games were played from October 22, 2008 to January 15, 2009.

Top 16

The surviving teams were then divided into four groups of four teams each, and again a round-robin system was adopted resulting in 6 games each, with the top 2 teams advancing to the quarterfinals. Tiebreakers are identical to those used in the Regular Season. Games began on January 28 and ended March 12.

Quarterfinals

In the quarterfinals, the top placed teams from each Top 16 group played second placed teams from a different group in a best-of-five playoff series, with the winners of those series advancing to the Final Four. This was the first season in which the quarterfinals were best-of-five; previously, they had been best-of-three. The quarterfinal matches were played from March 24 until April 9.

Final Four format

The culminating stage of the Euroleague in which the four remaining teams played a semifinal match and the winners of those advance to the final. The losers played in a third-place playoff. The team which was victorious in the Final (Panathinaikos) would be Euroleague champion. The Final Four semifinals were played May 1, with the third-place game and final on May 3.

Regular season
The regular season began on October 20, 2008 and concluded on January 15, 2009.

Top 16
The Top 16 stage was played from January 28 to March 12, 2009.

The draw was conducted on January 19 at Euroleague Basketball Company headquarters in Barcelona. The group winners in the Regular Season were drawn from one pot, the runners-up from one pot, the teams in 3rd place from one pot and those in 4th place from one pot. Teams that played in the same group in the Regular Season could not meet again in the Top 16. Also, teams from the same country could not be drawn into the same pool unless it was necessary to prevent teams from the same Regular Season group from being drawn together.

Quarterfinals
Team 1 hosted Games 1 and 2, plus Game 5 if necessary. Team 2 hosted Game 3, and Game 4 if necessary.

Final four

The Final Four was played on May 1 and on May 3. Semifinal games were played on Friday, while the third-place playoff and Final were played on Sunday. The event was hosted at the O2 World in Berlin. It was the first time the event was held in Berlin.

Individual statistics

Rating

Points

Rebounds

Assists

Other Stats

Game highs

Awards

Euroleague 2008–09 MVP
 Juan Carlos Navarro (  FC Barcelona )

Euroleague 2008–09 Final Four MVP
  Vassilis Spanoulis (  Panathinaikos )

All-Euroleague Team 2008–09

Rising Star
  Novica Veličković  (  Partizan )

Best Defender
  Dimitris Diamantidis (  Panathinaikos )

Top Scorer (Alphonso Ford Trophy)
  Igor Rakočević (  Tau Cerámica )

Coach of the Year (Alexander Gomelsky Award)
  Duško Vujošević (  Partizan )

Club Executive of the Year
  Marco Baldi ( Alba Berlin)

MVP Weekly

Regular season

Top 16

Quarter-finals

MVP of the Month

See also
 ULEB Eurocup 2008–09
 EuroChallenge 2008–09

References and notes

External links
Euroleague official site

 
 
EuroLeague seasons